

Kerala Motor Vehicles Department
The Kerala Motor Vehicles Department (MVD) is a line department of the Department of Transport, one of the departments of the Government of Kerala. The Kerala Motor Vehicles Department is entrusted with the responsibility of providing registration of vehicles in Kerala, issuance of Driving license, issuance of various permits, collection of road taxes, control of vehicular pollution and enforcement of the Motor Vehicles Act.

The Kerala MVD functions under the provisions of Section 213 of the Motor Vehicles Act, 1988. The Motor Vehicles Department is headed by the Transport Commissioner, an Indian Police Service officer of the rank of Additional Director General of Police. The Transport Commissioner is assisted by the Additional Transport Commissioner, Joint Transport Commissioners and Deputy Transport Commissioners. The current Transport Commissioner is S. Sreejith IPS.

Regional Transport Offices

Sub Regional Transport Offices

Future Sub Regional Transport Offices 
Government of Kerala has repeatedly intimated multiple legislative members that there are no plans to setup any new RTOs/SRTOs in Kerala unless the financial condition of Kerala improves.

References

External links
 https://www.mvd.kerala.gov.in (Link to Kerala Motor Vehicles Department. This website provide all the Rules and Regulations.)
Official list of Regional Transport Offices
Official list of Sub Regional Transport Offices

Roads in Kerala
RTO districts
India transport-related lists
India government-related lists